Simeon Milivoje Lozanić and Simeon "Sima" Lozanić (1847 – 1935) was a Serbian chemist, president of the Serbian Royal Academy, the first rector of the University of Belgrade, minister of foreign affairs, minister of industry and diplomat. At the Grandes écoles and later when it transformed into the University of Belgrade he taught chemistry and electrosynthesis.

Early years and education
Simeon Lozanić was born February 24, 1847, in Belgrade, Serbia. He completed legal studies in Belgrade, studied chemistry under Professor Johannes Wislicenus in Zürich and later with Professor August Wilhelm von Hofmann in Berlin. He earned his doctorate degree on March 19, 1870, at the University of Zurich. He was a professor at the "Great School" from 1872 and at the  University of Belgrade Faculty of Philosophy until 1924.

Career
When the University of Belgrade was founded in 1905, he was among the first eight full-time professors who selected the entire remaining academic staff. Sima Lozanić was then chosen as the first rector of the university. His 1905 opening ceremony words remained recorded as the following:

"Our previous belief that Serbian people will unite not by spelling books but by weapons was disastrous for our people's intellect. I believe the contrary - that education will be the main factor in solving that important question of ours and that it would have already been solved if we had better cared for our education. Therefore, I believe that education is the force that achieves all the goals. Had our education been more advanced, everything in the life of our people would have been better and more successful."

His chemistry classes paralleled, perhaps exceeded in some cases, those of the top European universities. They were organized with well-equipped laboratories and libraries, and produced some of the first chemistry textbooks. Lozanić himself wrote a number of textbooks, which covered various subject areas of chemistry: Inorganic chemistry, Organic chemistry, Analytical chemistry and Chemical technology. His textbooks were internationally renowned and in some areas groundbreaking. For example, Lozanić's Inorganic Chemistry textbook was the first European university textbook with Dmitriy Mendeleyev's periodic table of elements and one of the first containing a chapter on Thermochemistry. His Organic Chemistry textbooks are among the first books in which the compounds were represented by structural formulas.

He also did scientific and professional work related to all areas of Chemistry; some of his most valued works were about electrosynthesis in which he researched the reactions of CO and CO2 with other substances under the effect of electric discharge. He published over 200 scientific papers in applied and experimental chemistry.

Lozanić performed the first analysis of thermal water of Gamzigrad spa in 1889. He became a member of the Serbian Learned Society (Serbian Academy of Sciences and Arts) on January 30, 1873, associate member of Serbian Royal Academy on January 23, 1888, and became a full member on January 6, 1890. He was a president of Serbian Royal Academy twice - 1899 to 1900 and 1903 to 1906. From 1907 to 1912 he was a president of Serbian Chemistry Society.

He was the minister of industry from January 12, 1894, to March 21, 1894, and October 15, 1894, to June 25, 1895, and October 11, 1897, to June 30, 1899, minister of foreign affairs from March 21, 1894, to October 15, 1894, and from December 23, 1902, to March 23, 1903, as well as a diplomat and participant in all wars of the time. Lozanić was the ambassador of the Serbian government in London from 1900. He was a president of Serbian refugee aid committee in 1916 and a head of US mission for aid and support of Serbia from 1917.

He was the first honorary doctor of sciences of the University of Belgrade. He died July 7, 1935, in Belgrade, in the age of 89. His son Milivoje S. Lozanić was also a chemist and inherited his university position as the professor of Chemistry. Sima's two daughters, Ana Lozanić Marinković (1882-1973) became a well-known painter and Jelena Lozanić who, like her father, affirmed in humanitarian work and in the battle for women's rights, participated in international congresses in the United States in 1915 as a Serbian Red Cross delegate to enlist aid for her war desolated country. Since the war continued in Serbia, she stayed in America until the year 1920, when she married John Frothingham, the great benefactor to Serbian people. Together with Michael Pupin, Mr. and Mrs. John Frothingham contributed greatly in delivering humanitarian aid.

Legacy
An exhibition "Sima Lozanić in Serbian science and culture" was held in his honor, organized by Serbian Academy of Sciences and Arts from January to March 1993, in Academy's gallery in Knez Mihailova street in Belgrade. His life and work was especially investigated by chemist Snežana Bojović, who wrote a 262-page book Sima Lozanić.

He is included in The 100 most prominent Serbs. A street in Dedinje is named after him.

He was decorated Order of St. Sava I and III degree, Order of the Cross of Takovo, Order of Miloš the Great III degree, Silver medal for bravery, Commemorative war medal, Order of the Redeemer I degree, Order of Orange-Nassau I degree, Order of Osmanieh I degree, Order of the crown of Romania I degree.

See also
Lozanić's triangle
 Jovan Žujović
 Jovan Cvijić

References

Bibliography

External links
Serbian Academy of Arts and Sciences

1847 births
1935 deaths
Serbian chemists
Politicians from Belgrade
Academic staff of the University of Belgrade
Rectors of the University of Belgrade
Academic staff of Belgrade Higher School
Scientists from Belgrade
Foreign ministers of Serbia